Paulo Henrique Silva Ribeiro (born 26 July 1999), commonly known as Paulo Baya, is a Brazilian footballer who plays as a forward for Ventforet Kofu, on loan from Cascavel.

Career statistics

Club

References

External links

1999 births
Living people
Brazilian footballers
Brazilian expatriate footballers
Association football forwards
Campeonato Brasileiro Série D players
Ventforet Kofu players
Brazilian expatriate sportspeople in Japan
Expatriate footballers in Japan
Sportspeople from Pará
People from Marabá